Awake is the second studio album by American DJ Illenium, released via Seeking Blue/Kasaya Records on September 21, 2017.

Background 
Consisting of 13 songs, the album includes five previously released singles titled "Fractures", "Feel Good", "Sound of Walking Away", "Crawl Outta Love" and "Leaving". Illenium played the 12th track "Beautiful Creatures" at the Hakkasan Nightclub. He also announced the Awake tour, in which he would perform in November and December. He announced the release date of the album on August 8, 2017, in one of his internet online fan communities one day after releasing the final single from the album. He posted with the caption "Album release getting ANNOUNCED with crawl Monday. Pre order avail next week." Illenium spoke about the album's comparison to his previous one, he said "A lot of strong vocals and melodies but more recorded elements than Ashes. The new album is a split between vocal stuff and chill instrumental tracks." Illenium released the fifth single "Leaving" on September 15, 2017.

Track listing

• Leaving features uncredited vocals from Eden

Charts

Weekly charts

Year-end charts

References

2017 albums
Future bass albums
Illenium albums